Virgil Jennings Barnes (March 5, 1897 – July 24, 1958), was a professional baseball player who was a pitcher in the Major Leagues from 1919 to 1928. He played for the New York Giants from 1919 to 1928, and also played for the Boston Braves in 1928 after being traded to the Braves in mid-season. His brother Jesse also pitched in the major leagues and was Virgil's teammate on the Giants from 1919 through 1923. On September 24, 1922, St. Louis Cardinals outfielder Rogers Hornsby hit two home runs, one off each brother, when both were pitching for the Giants.

External links

1897 births
1958 deaths
Major League Baseball pitchers
New York Giants (NL) players
Boston Braves players
Baseball players from Kansas
People from Nemaha County, Kansas
Davenport Blue Sox players
Kansas City Blues (baseball) players
Sioux City Indians players
Rochester Hustlers players
Milwaukee Brewers (minor league) players
Baltimore Orioles (IL) players